Murphy House may refer to:

 Samuel R. Murphy House, Eutaw, Alabama, listed on the National Register of Historic Places (NRHP) in Greene County
 The Murphy House, Montgomery, Alabama, NRHP-listed in Montgomery County
 Murphy-Collins House, Tuscaloosa, Alabama, listed on the NRHP in Tuscaloosa County
 Charles H. Murphy Sr. House, El Dorado, Arkansas, listed on the NRHP in Union County
 William J. Murphy House, Fort Smith, Arkansas, listed on the NRHP in Sebastian County
 Boone-Murphy House, Pine Bluff, Arkansas, listed on the NRHP in Jefferson County
 Gage/Murphy House, Prescott, Arizona, listed on the NRHP in Yavapai County
 Carter House Inn, also known as Murphy House, Eureka, California, replica of destroyed San Francisco house, NRHP-listed in Humboldt County
 D. J. Murphy House, Livermore, California, listed on the NRHP in California
 Cosier-Murphy House, New Fairfield, Connecticut, listed on the NRHP in Fairfield County
 Patrick Murphy House (Windsor, Connecticut), listed on the NRHP in Hartford County
 Murphy-Burroughs House, Fort Myers, Florida, NRHP-listed in Lee County
 Daniel F. Murphy House, Boise, Idaho, listed on the NRHP in Ada County
 W. H. Murphy House, Shoshone, Idaho, listed on the NRHP in Lincoln County
 Henry H. Smith/J.H. Murphy House, Davenport, Iowa, NRHP-listed in Scott County
 Stephen Murphy House, Little Hickman, Kentucky, listed on the NRHP in Madison County
 William Murphy House, Brookline, Massachusetts, NRHP-listed in Norfolk County
 Patrick Murphy Three-Decker, Worcester, Massachusetts, NRHP-listed in Worcester County
 Timothy Murphy House, Crystal Falls, Michigan, listed on the NRHP in Iron County
 Frank Murphy Birthplace, Harbor Beach, Michigan, NRHP-listed in Huron County
 Hinkle-Murphy House, Minneapolis, Minnesota, NRHP-listed in Hennepin County
Patrick Murphy House (Natchez, Mississippi), listed on the NRHP in Adams County, Mississippi
 John T. Murphy House, Helena, Montana, listed on the NRHP in Lewis and Clark County
 William L. and Sydney V. Murphy House, Lincoln, Nebraska, listed on the NRHP in Lancaster County
 Murphy-Lamb House and Cemetery, Garland, North Carolina, listed on the NRHP in Sampson County
 Dixon-Leftwich-Murphy House, Greensboro, North Carolina, listed on the NRHP in Guilford County
 Daniel Murphy Log House, St. Martin, Ohio, listed on the NRHP in Brown County
 George A. Murphy House, Muskogee, Oklahoma, listed on the NRHP in Muskogee County
 Murphy House (Stillwater, Oklahoma), listed on the NRHP in Payne County
 Lester and Hazel Murphy House, Hood River, Oregon, NRHP-listed in Hood River County
 Paul C. Murphy House, Portland, Oregon, NRHP-listed
 Paul F. Murphy House, Portland, Oregon, NRHP-listed
 Dennis J. Murphy House at Ogden Farm, Middletown, Rhode Island, NRHP-listed
 Mrs. J. V. Murphy House, Victoria, Texas, NRHP-listed in Victoria County
 Martin Murphy House, Sunnyvale, California, see Sunnyvale Heritage Park Museum

See also
Patrick Murphy House (disambiguation)